The Mendocino Coast Botanical Gardens are located on 47 acres (19 hectares) in Fort Bragg, California, United States between California's Highway One and the Pacific Ocean. The garden property includes canyons, wetlands, coastal bluffs, and a closed-cone pine forest.

The Gardens comprise plant collections suited to its mild coastal Mediterranean climate and acidic soils including: Native forests and bluff plants, Heaths and Heathers, Rhododendrons, Camellias, Fuchsias, Dahlias, Magnolias, Maples, Succulents, Begonias and Conifers. The Heath and Heather collection is part of the National Plant Consortium.  MCBG is also recognized as a conifer reference collection by the American Conifer Society. A historic corridor on the south side of the property includes the 19th Century Parrish Family home, orchard and cemetery. In 2013, the demonstration "kitchen garden" developed there provided more than 4,000 lbs of fresh produce to the local food bank while testing heritage and newly developed varieties for local success and demonstrating best practices in food gardening for volunteers and visitors.

Admission is charged for entrance to the Gardens, with discounts for children and seniors or through purchase of an annual membership. Main trails are accessible and electric carts are offered on a first-come/first-served basis for visitors with mobility issues. Access is subject to special ticket purchase for Gardens fundraising events including "Art in the Gardens" in August, "Festival of Lights" on December weekends and a biannual "My Garden" event in May. The Gardens are closed on the Saturday after Labor Day for the annual WineSong event that supports the local hospital.

Public classes and other events such as the annual Rhododendron Festival and Conifer Day are posted on the Gardens website, www.gardenbythesea.org.
Amenities include a gift shop, plant nursery and Rhody's Garden Cafe.

History

The Gardens were founded in 1961 by Ernest and Betty Schoefer. For the next 16 years, the Schoefers managed the garden as a private enterprise. In 1978, the property was sold to 3 investors who, in 1980 sold it to another group of investors who formed Garden Land Partners (GLP) as a limited partnership.

In 1982, the California Coastal Conservancy provided a grant of $232,000 to the Mendocino Coast Recreation and Park District (MCRPD) to acquire 12 acres of the original 47 acre garden, an access easement over 5 acres of coastal bluffs, and an easement for 25 parking spaces adjacent to Highway One. This 12-acre property was leased to Mendocino Coast Botanical Gardens Preservation Corporation (MCBGPC), a 501-C-3 non-profit corporation, which continues to manage and operate the Botanical Gardens.

In 1988, when the remaining 35 acres of the original gardens came on the market, the Mendocino County Board of Supervisors and MCRPD asked the Coastal Conservancy to consider funding acquisition of the additional land to be added to the gardens. In June 1988, the Coastal Conservancy gave a $50,000 grant to MCRPD for preparation of a detailed Master Plan for the Gardens. This work was carried out by consultants, Coastal Conservancy staff, the Gardens Board of Directors, volunteers and Garden staff. The resulting plan was the Mendocino Coast Botanical Gardens Coastal Restoration Plan.

The Master Plan was presented to the Coastal Conservancy on June 22, 1990. In June 1991, the Coastal Conservancy reached a unanimous decision to provide a grant of two million dollars to the MCRPD to purchase the remaining 35 acres held by GLP.  The Mendocino Coast Botanical Gardens was restored to the original 47 acres, with title held by Mendocino Coast Recreation and Park District with strict conditions that: "The real property is being acquired to accomplish the purposes of the Mendocino Coast Botanical Gardens Restoration Plan, adopted by the Conservancy on June 22, 1990. These purposes include protection of the natural and man-made resources of the Botanical Gardens, preservation of public access, and expansion of recreational opportunities." Responsibility for management and operations was assigned to Mendocino Coast Botanical Gardens Preservation Corporation (MCBG) to which the property was leased for $1/year for 25 years (through 2016).

See also 
 List of botanical gardens in the United States

References

External links 

 Mendocino Coast Botanical Gardens

Botanical gardens in California
Parks in Mendocino County, California
1961 establishments in the United States